Zin or ZIN may refer to:

Places 
Zin, Afghanistan, a town in Afghanistan
Zin Desert, an area mentioned in the Bible
Interlaken Airport, Switzerland (by IATA code)

Other uses 
Zin (vodou) Three-legged cauldron used in kanzo rite
Zin (water spirits), mythical water spirits of West Africa
Zinfandel, a variety of red grape commonly used to make wine
Zin Hizaki, a character from Sky Girls
Zin (band), a compas band whose lead singer is Alan Cavé
Zinza language (by ISO 639 code), a Bantu language of Tanzania

See also
 
Zins, a surname
Zinn, a surname